N. Lee S. Price is a retired United States Army officer who last served as the Program Executive Officer for the United States Army's Program Executive Office, Command Control Communications-Tactical (PEO C3T), headquartered at Aberdeen Proving Ground.

Price became the first female Program Executive Officer for the army in November 2009 when she became the PEO for C3T. Within one year of Price's tenure, PEO C3T was awarded the David Packard award, the Department of Defense acquisition community's highest award. In July 2008, Price became the first woman in the Army Acquisition Corps to be promoted to the rank of brigadier general. She also was the first woman selected for general officer rank while serving in a special operations unit. Price was nominated by President Barack Obama to the grade of major general on July 27, 2011. The Senate confirmed this nomination on November 10, 2011. Price retired from military service in March 2014.

Early life and education
Price attended the Shades Valley High School in Birmingham, Alabama, and earned her Bachelor of Science degree from the University of Alabama at Birmingham. She also earned her master's degree in information systems, from the University of Arizona, and another master's degree, from the Industrial College of the Armed Forces in Washington, D.C.

Career
Price began her military career in 1975 as a private first class in the Alabama National Guard. She was commissioned through Officer Candidate School (Alabama Military Academy), and she was then part of the Women's Army Corps. Upon its disestablishment in October 1978, she was transferred to the U.S. Army Signal Corps. She entered active duty in October 1981. Price has a Bachelor of Science degree from the University of Alabama at Birmingham and master's degrees from the University of Arizona and the Industrial College of the Armed Forces in Washington, D.C.

As the United States Army's first female Program Executive Officer (PEO), Price guided the Program Executive Office, Command Control Communications-Tactical (C3T)  workforce of more than 1,800 personnel who execute an annual budget of $4 billion. The dedicated PEO C3T team works by the Warfighter's side in training and theater locations throughout the world. They acquire, sustain and support the networked mission command solutions that bring technological dominance to present and future Warfighters. Within one year of Price's tenure, which began in November 2009, 
PEO C3T was awarded the David Packard award, the Department of Defense acquisition community's highest award.

In 2004, Price received the Army Acquisition Excellence Project Manager (PM) of the Year Award as PM Defense Communications and Army Transmission Systems (DCATS). As PM DCATS, she managed programs valued at more than $2 billion. One was a $300 million project to build a commercial communications network in Iraq, Afghanistan and Kuwait. With this came the fielding of the first Very Small Aperture Satellite Terminals to combat service support troops and an effort that more than quadrupled deliveries of Land Mobile Radio systems to numerous Department of Defense forces and government agencies. During her subsequent three-year tenure as the Deputy Acquisition Executive for the United States Special Operations Command (USSOCOM), Price was responsible for providing more than $3 billion per year of specialized equipment for service-wide National and Theater Special Operators. The USSOCOM acquisitions focused on products such as body armor, aircraft, sensors, radios, watercraft and ammunition within six months from validation to delivery.

After her retirement in 2014, Price started her own company, Price Solutions. She serves a wide variety of customers in the areas of executive coaching, IT, governance, compensation, and leadership. She sits on several boards where she also holds a leadership role. Her first book, “No Greater Honor: Lessons from my Life as a Soldier” is due out in the fall of 2020.

Awards and decorations
Price's awards include the Army Distinguished Service Medal, Defense Superior Service Medal, the Legion of Merit (two awards), the Bronze Star Medal, the Defense Meritorious Service Medal (two awards), the Meritorious Service Medal (five awards), the Joint Meritorious Unit Award, the Iraq Campaign Medal, the Korean Defense Service Medal, the Army Staff Badge and the Combat Action Badge. In 2009, Price was inducted into the Alabama Business and Professional Women's Foundation Academy of Honor.

References

External links
 PEO C3T Public Site: http://peoc3t.army.mil/c3t/
 Alumni profile at UA: https://web.archive.org/web/20110927224812/http://mis.eller.arizona.edu/alumni/profiles/lee_price.asp

Year of birth missing (living people)
Living people
United States Army personnel of the Iraq War
United States Army personnel of the Gulf War
Place of birth missing (living people)
Recipients of the Defense Superior Service Medal
Recipients of the Legion of Merit
Female generals of the United States Army
Dwight D. Eisenhower School for National Security and Resource Strategy alumni
21st-century American women